James Merle Ideman (born April 2, 1931) is a former United States district judge of the United States District Court for the Central District of California.

Education and career

Born in Rockford, Illinois, Ideman received a Bachelor of Arts degree from The Citadel in 1953 and a Juris Doctor from the USC Gould School of Law in 1963. He served in the United States Army from 1949 to 1950, 1953 to 1956, and from 1965 to 1984. From 1963 to 1964 he was law clerk to superior court judge McIntyre Faries. He was a deputy district attorney of Los Angeles County, California from 1964 to 1979, and a judge of the Los Angeles County Superior Court, California from 1979 to 1984.

Federal judicial service

On May 24, 1984, Ideman was nominated by President Ronald Reagan to a seat on the United States District Court for the Central District of California vacated by Judge Lawrence Tupper Lydick. Ideman was confirmed by the United States Senate on June 15, 1984, and received his commission the same day. He assumed senior status on April 2, 1998, retiring fully on September 11, 1998.

References

Sources
 

1931 births
Living people
California state court judges
Judges of the United States District Court for the Central District of California
Superior court judges in the United States
The Citadel, The Military College of South Carolina alumni
United States district court judges appointed by Ronald Reagan
20th-century American judges
United States Army officers
USC Gould School of Law alumni